The Netherlands women's national rugby union team are a national sporting side of Netherlands, representing them at rugby union. The side first played in 1982.

History

The Netherlands' women's national rugby union team hosted the first ever women's international women's rugby union match. This match took place in Utrecht on June 13, 1982. France won against the Netherlands with 4–0.

The Netherlands made their debut at the 1991 World Cup. They finished in 7th place out of 12 teams. They hosted the 1998 World Cup and qualified for the 2002 World Cup, where they finished 13th and 15th. 

Women's rugby has increased in popularity in the Netherlands in the past decades. The airing of the 2015 World Cup on national television has further attributed to the increase in popularity.

Records

Overall 

(Full internationals only)

Rugby World Cup

Players

Previous squads

See also
 Rugby union in the Netherlands

References

External links

 Nederlandse Rugby Bond - Official Site
Netherlands at RugbyData.com

Women's national rugby union teams
European national women's rugby union teams
Netherlands national rugby union team